Trevor Crothers (20 May 1938 – 9 July 2002) was a South Australian politician. Crothers entered the South Australian Legislative Council in 1987 to fill a Labor Party vacancy, and then was re-elected as a Labor candidate in 1993. However he resigned from the party in order to support the Olsen Liberal government's legislation to privatise ETSA in 1999.

His first electoral test as a non-Labor candidate was at the 2002 election. He stood as an independent for the Legislative Council, but failed to get elected.

References

Independent members of the Parliament of South Australia
1938 births
2002 deaths
Members of the South Australian Legislative Council
Australian Labor Party members of the Parliament of South Australia
20th-century Australian politicians
21st-century Australian politicians